Markkleeberg is an affluent suburb of Leipzig, located in the Leipzig district of the Free State of Saxony, Germany. The river Pleiße runs through the city, which borders Leipzig to the north and to the west.

Markkleeberg is known to be the entry point to a region of recultivated open-cast mining lakes south of Leipzig dubbed the Leipziger Neuseenland.

History 
The town now called Markkleeberg has its origins in several towns that have been merged over the years. The center of modern-day Markkleeberg used to be called Oetzsch. It was merged with the smaller outlying district Markkleeberg in 1911 and renamed Oetzsch-Markkleeberg. Oetzsch-Markkleeberg was in turn merged with Gautzsch and the whole town was called "Markkleeberg", although Markkleeberg was the smallest, because it sounded most Germanic at a time of Nazi-led Germanisation.

The etymology of Markkleeberg may be "clover hill market town". The name of Oetzsch has most likely a Wendish origin. In 1316 it was mentioned in a document as "Euschiz". The village originally had the form of a Rundling.

In 1813 much of the Battle of Leipzig took place where today's Markkleeberg is situated. During 1944 and 1945, a forced labor camp for women was established in the town, initially a subcamp of the Ravensbrück concentration camp and later of Buchenwald. Among the inmates were a thousand Jewish women from Hungary and 250 French resistance fighters. In early April 1945, the surviving inmates were transferred to the Mauthausen-Gusen camp in Austria.

Today, Markkleeberg is a growing town because of its proximity to Leipzig.

Historical population 
(Source since 1998: Statistical bureau of Saxony)

Culture 
Markkleeberg is a well-known tourist destination. Cospudener See, Markkleeberger See, Kanupark Markkleeberg as well as many parks are close to the city.

Twin towns – sister cities

Markkleeberg is twinned with:
 Boville Ernica, Italy

 Neusäß, Germany
 Pierre-Bénite, France
 Zărnești, Romania

References 

 
Leipzig (district)